A Corazón Abierto is a Mexican telenovela produced by RCN Television in collaboration with Vista Production (first season only) and Disney Media Network Latin America. Based on Shonda Rhimes' Grey's Anatomy, it is adapted and supervised by Colombian writer, Fernando Gaitán. It marks the return of Sergio Basañez as a protagonist with the presentation of Iliana Fox as a protagonist. It also marks the return of Angélica Aragón to the television screen after 8 years of abstinence, since El Regreso, Juan David Burns as producer, and Raul Quintanilla as director. It was originally planned to air on Azteca 7, but was changed to Azteca 13, replacing Emperatriz, on 9 November 2011. It was filmed in Colombia for eight months, from February to October 2011. In December 2011, Azteca 13 executives extended the novela for another 58 episodes, making a total of 138 episodes. 2012 episodes are filmed in Mexico, instead of Colombia. Elisa Salinas replaced her husband, Juan David Burns, as the producer in the second season. Filming of the second season ended on 17 April. Due to successful public reception, the producers plans for another season. The executives of Azteca discussed with Disney Media Networks for a third season, but later cancelled the idea.

Cast

Main cast

Supporting cast

Season 1

Special guest star

Recurring cast

Supporting cast

Hermes Camelo
Estefany Escobar
Alfredo Barrero - Gomez
Harold Fonseca
Claudia Rocio Mora
Martha Silva
Andres Felipe Moreno - Armando
Lisbet Cepeda
Mauricio Sarmento
Nini Pabon
Walter Moreno
Luz Estrada
Liz Barbosa
Angela Duarte
Rodrigo Marulanda
Shirley Marulanda
Lucho Velasco
Sebastian Ospina
Mabel Bohorquez
Rosmery Cardenas
Camila Bruges
Emma Carolina Cruz
Isabella Grimaldo
Molly Quevedo
Andres Bermudez
Juliana Galviz
Jacky Aristizabal
Mario Calderon
Valentina Carrasco
Johnny Forero
Rodolfo Ordonez
Giovanny Guzman
Ricardo Riveros
Karem Escobar
julio Pachon
Angelo valotta
Manuel Busquets
Maria Eugenia Penagos
Julian Beltran
Alberto Cadeno
Francisco Perez
Shirley Martinez
Edward Zuniga
Nicolas Gomez
Carlos penagos
Anderson Otalvaro
Yeimily Medrano
maria Isabel Bernal
Johan Mendez
Rodolfo Silva
Juan David Galindo
Wilkins Rodriguez
Cristina Ruiz
Linda Patino
Piero Gomez
Diego Camacho
Gerardo Calero
Bernardo Garcia
Alieta Montero
Jonathan Santamaria
Andrea Naranjo
Bernardo Garcia
Alieta Montero
Claudia Cadavid
Lorena Tovar

Season 2

Special guest star

Supporting cast

Upcoming guest stars
Cristóbal Orellana
Luis Carlos
Cristian Iker Rosas

Casting
The role of Maria Alejandra was actually given to Edith González, but was replaced by Adriana Louvier, and eventually Iliana Fox. Later, Gonzalez stars in Cielo Rojo, and Louvier in Emperatriz. Most cast and crews have worked together in other telenovelas produced by Azteca such as  Cuando seas mía (Fernando Gaitan, Elisa Salinas, Juan David Burns, Sergio Basanez, Iliana Fox, Rodrigo Abed, Rodrigo Cachero, and Alejandro Lukini) and La duda (Jose Carlos Rodriguez, Fabiana Perzabal). Venezuelan actress Johanna Morales is promoted from recurring role to starring role in Episode 74.

The second season is filmed in Mexico. Since Venezuelan actress Johanna Morales could not continue to stay in Mexico, therefore her character is killed off.

References

2011 telenovelas
2011 Mexican television series debuts
2012 Mexican television series endings
Grey's Anatomy
Mexican telenovelas
TV Azteca telenovelas
Spanish-language telenovelas
Medical telenovelas
Mexican television series based on American television series